Corythoxestis is a genus of moths in the family Gracillariidae.

Species
Corythoxestis aletreuta (Meyrick, 1936)
Corythoxestis cyanolampra Vári, 1961
Corythoxestis pentarcha (Meyrick, 1922)
Corythoxestis praeustella (van Deventer, 1904)
Corythoxestis sunosei (Kumata, 1998)
Corythoxestis tricalysiella Kobayashi, Huang & Hirowatari, 2013
Corythoxestis yaeyamensis (Kumata, 1998)

External links
Global Taxonomic Database of Gracillariidae (Lepidoptera)

Phyllocnistinae
Gracillarioidea genera